Krounoi may refer to:
Krounoi, Kallikomo, a village in Kallikomo, Greece
Krounoi (Thrace), an ancient Greek colony in Thrace, now in Bulgaria